Baron Frédéric Guillaume de Pury (15 December 1831 – 11 November 1890) was a Swiss-Australian winemaker, farmer, statesman, and diplomat. From 1875 to 1890  he served as the Swiss Honorary Consul to Australia in Melbourne and was also a justice of the peace. He exported wine, produced from his vineyards in Australia, to England, France, and other European countries.

Biography 
De Pury was born on 15 December 1831 in Neuchâtel to Baron Edouard Charles Alexandre de Pury, a member of the Grand Council of Neuchâtel, and his second wife, Julie de Sandoz-Travers. His family had been ennobled by Frederick II of Prussia. De Pury was the granduncle of Roland de Pury.

In 1851 he moved to England to study English and agriculture. On 6 May 1852, de Pury left England for Victoria, Australia. He first worked tending cattle on a property in Yering that was owned by Paul de Castella. In 1855 he and Hubert de Castella purchased Dalry, a former out-station of Yering. They were joined in business by de Pury's brother, Samuel, who had recently arrived from Switzerland. In 1858 he sold Dalry and rented land near Darlot Creek to graze sheep and breed horses. In 1860 de Pury purchased land near Lilydale and named it Cooring Yering, planting a vineyard and building a house and wine cellar there. In 1863, along with George Langdon, he purchased nine-hundred acres in Yering from de Castella's creditors, which he named Yeringberg, starting a vineyard there. In 1869 he bought out Langdon. Yerinberg was later enlarged to 1,160 acres and produced over 90,922 litres of wine annually. The wine was exported to Europe.

De Pury was a leader of the Swiss community in Lilydale. He became a justice of the peace in 1862 and was a member of the Upper Yarra District Roads Board for twenty-one years. When the Shire of Lillydale was established in 1872, he served as one of its first councilors and later as its president. From 1875 to 1890 he served as an honorary consul for the Swiss Confederation in Melbourne.

A devout Protestant, de Pury supported the construction of an Anglican church in Lilydale. He had an interest in Aboriginal Australians and was an adviser of William Barak. In 1881 he served on a government inquiry into the condition of the Aboriginal station at Coranderrk.

On 2 February 1869 he married Adelaide Augusta Ibbotson at St James Cathedral. They had two sons, George Alphonse and Montague Edouard Victor.

He was appointed as a commissioner of the International Exhibition in Melbourne. He died on 11 November 1890 in Lausanne, Switzerland.

References 

1831 births
1890 deaths
Australian pastoralists
Australian justices of the peace
Australian winemakers
Barons of Germany
Consuls of Switzerland to Australia
Frédéric
Nobility of Neuchâtel
People from Neuchâtel
Swiss emigrants to Australia
Swiss farmers
Swiss Protestants
Swiss winemakers
19th-century Australian businesspeople